Soltanabad-e Namak (also Romanized as Solţānābād-e Namaḵ; also known as Solţānābād and Sultanābād) is a village in Piveh Zhan Rural District, Ahmadabad District, Mashhad County, Razavi Khorasan Province, Iran. At the 2006 census, its population was 1,778, in 427 families.

References 

Populated places in Mashhad County